La Mort Pop Club is the fourth full-length album by Canadian indie-rock band We Are Wolves, released on February 26, 2013.

Track listing
 "As the Moon Sets" – 3:17
 "We Are Made of Fire (Sisyphus)" – 2:50
 "Night" – 3:04
 "Sun" – 4:43
 "Angel" – 2:55
 "Moving Fast" – 3:39
 "Snake in the Sand" – 3:24
 "Mirror" – 2:40
 "Voices" – 4:41
 "Sudden Little Death" – 3:40

Personnel
 Pierre-Luc Bégin – drums   
 Vincent Lévesque – keyboard, backing vocals 
 Alexander Ortiz – vocals, bass, guitar

References

We Are Wolves albums
2013 albums
Bravo Musique albums